is a Japanese yuri manga written and illustrated by Miyabi Fujieda. The series debuted in the [ES]~ Eternal Sisters anthology and was serialized in Ichijinsha's Comic Yuri Hime magazine from 2005 and was collected into two bound volume. It was licensed for an English-language release by JManga in 2013.

Plot 
After winning a lottery prize Seriho Inukai opens up her own tea house. She soon comes to employ a regular from cafe Kotoori Sarasa.
Together the two gently perform the tasks at their restful tea house and slowly grow closer in the process.

Characters 
Kotoori Sarasa
 Voiced by: Nana Mizuki 
 A former regular at Amber Tea House turned part-time staff. She quickly fell in love with Seriho, the owner of the tea house. She is seen as serious and mature, and is sometimes called a "cool lady" by students, but she also has a slightly emotional side and may start crying when she's impressed.

Inukai Seriho
 Voiced by: Yukana 
 The owner of Amber Tea House. With the prize money she won in the lottery, Seriho opened a tea shop that specialized in black tea. She has a gentle personality and is not good at management, but her tea skills are top notch. 

Shishio Haru
 Voiced by: Yu Asakawa 
 A friend of Sarasa. She has a mischiefoius side and likes to make fun of serious people.

Hinoka Shiratori
 Voiced by: Kimiko Koyama
 A friend of Sarasa. She always smiles and has a bright and noisy personality. Her hobby is mainly woodworking and DIY.

Media

Manga

Drama CD 
In 2009 a bonus Drama CD was include in volume 16 of Comic Yuri Hime, Ameiro Kochakan Kandan ~ Pink Princess. Following which Ameiro Kochakan Kandann ~ White Engage was released with the deluxe edition of Volume 1 and Ameiro Kochakan Kandan Blue Christmas with the deluxe edition of Volume 2.

Character's from Ameiro Kochakan Kandan also featured in the Drama DC of Miyabi's other work Kotonoha no Miko to Kotodama no Majo to.

Reception 

Erica Friedman of Yuricon praised the series, noting that "Yuri in this series is a pervasive atmosphere, rather than a single event or couple. The teahouse may be called “Amber” but it is the scent of lilies that flows through the door onto the street"

References

External links 
 

Slice of life anime and manga
Yuri (genre) anime and manga